The Team technical routine competition of the 2020 European Aquatics Championships was held on 12 May 2021.

Results
The final was held at 16:00.

References

Team technical routine